Juanita Ruth Feldhahn (born 7 June 1973) is a road cyclist from Australia. She represented her nation at the 2000 Summer Olympics in the women's road race.

References

External links
 Profile at sports-reference.com

Australian female cyclists
Cyclists at the 2000 Summer Olympics
Olympic cyclists of Australia
Living people
Sportswomen from Queensland
1973 births